George Fenwick Cresswell (22 March 1915 – 10 January 1966) was a cricketer who played three Tests for New Zealand. Born in Wanganui, he was the older brother of Arthur Cresswell. He was the 50th Test cap for New Zealand.

Cricket career
Cresswell was educated at Marlborough Boys' College, where he played for the first XI. An accurate slow-medium bowler, he had played his cricket for Marlborough in the Hawke Cup when he was selected to make his first-class debut at the age of 33 in a trial match for The Rest against a New Zealand XI in January 1949. After taking three wickets in the match he was selected for the 1949 tour to England.

In England he took 62 wickets at 26.09 in 19 matches, and found his best form late in the tour, taking 5 for 30 against Yorkshire and 6 for 21 against Glamorgan. He made his Test debut in the final Test against England at The Oval. He opened the bowling with Jack Cowie, and took 6 for 168 in England's only innings. Batting at his usual position of number 11, he made 12 not out, which remained his highest first-class score. As of early 2021 he is still the oldest person (at 34 years and 146 days) to take five or more wickets in an innings in his first Test.

He played for Wellington in 1949–50. He also played for New Zealand against the touring Australian team, taking 8 for 100 in Australia's only innings; then, batting at number 11, he put on an unbroken partnership of nine runs with Walter Hadlee to avert an innings defeat. Earlier in the season, captaining Marlborough in a Hawke Cup elimination match against Nelson, he took 16 wickets in the match (8 for 44 and 8 for 46) but Nelson won by two wickets.

In 1950–51 he played for Central Districts in their inaugural Plunket Shield season, taking 5 for 31 against Canterbury at Palmerston North and 5 for 38 against Auckland at New Plymouth to give them victory in their first two home games and second place in the final table. He played in the two Tests against the visiting English side, taking 7 wickets at 17.71. After that he suffered from a back injury, and played only three matches in the next four seasons before retiring in 1956.

Cresswell had an unusual run-up and action. Dick Brittenden wrote: "he bowled from a run of a few paces. He began each time by standing stiffly to attention, poised for an appreciable little interval. Then he moved in and bowled with one of the strangest of actions – no left arm, and his chest quite square to the batsman."

His younger brother Arthur also played as a pace bowler for Wellington and Central Districts in the same period.

Death
Cresswell was found dead at his home in Blenheim in January 1966, with a gun next to him. He had been suffering from cancer.

See also 
 List of New Zealand cricketers who have taken five-wicket hauls on Test debut

References

External links
 

1915 births
1966 suicides
Central Districts cricketers
Cricketers who have taken five wickets on Test debut
New Zealand cricketers
New Zealand Test cricketers
Cricketers from Whanganui
Suicides by firearm in New Zealand
Wellington cricketers
People educated at Marlborough Boys' College
Burials at Omaka Cemetery